Warren Frederick Kitzmiller (March 21, 1943 – July 10, 2022) was an American politician who was a member of the Vermont House of Representatives from 2001 to 2022 and was a Democrat. He was appointed to the Vermont General Assembly in 2001, when his wife Karen B. Kitzmiller who served in the Vermont General Assembly, died from cancer. He owned a sports store in Montpelier and served on the Montpelier City Council.

Kitzmiller died following a stroke on July 10, 2022, at the age of 79.

References

1943 births
2022 deaths
Politicians from Erie, Pennsylvania
People from Montpelier, Vermont
Businesspeople from Vermont
21st-century American politicians
Vermont city council members
Democratic Party members of the Vermont House of Representatives